Kangelo(also known as Kangelou)      is a village in Rastupey Rural District, in the Central District of Savadkuh County, Mazandaran Province, Iran. Kangelo Castle dates back to the Sassanian empire.

References

Geography of Mazandaran Province
Populated places in Savadkuh County